Halifax is an English surname.

Notable people and characters with the name include:

Title
Earl of Halifax, a British title created four times and held by, among others:
Charles Montagu, 1st Earl of Halifax (1661–1715), English poet and statesman
George Montagu, 1st Earl of Halifax (c. 1684–1739), British politician
George Montagu-Dunk, 2nd Earl of Halifax (1716–1771)
Charles Wood, 1st Viscount Halifax (1800–1885), British Whig politician
Charles Wood, 2nd Viscount Halifax (1839–1934), British ecumenist
Edward Wood, 1st Earl of Halifax (1881–1959), British Conservative politician
Charles Wood, 2nd Earl of Halifax (1912–1980), British politician and peer
Peter Wood, 3rd Earl of Halifax (born 1944), British peer and Conservative politician
Marquess of Halifax, a title in the Peerage of England created in 1682
George Savile, 1st Marquess of Halifax (1633–1695), English statesman, writer and politician
William Savile, 2nd Marquess of Halifax (1665–1700)

Surname
Joan Halifax (born 1942), Zen Buddhist roshi

Fictional characters

John Halifax, central character of the novel John Halifax, Gentleman (1856)